Leora is an unincorporated community in northern Stoddard County, Missouri, United States. It is located approximately thirteen miles north of Dexter.

A post office called Leora was established in 1880, and remained in operation until 1969. The community was named after Leora White, the daughter of an early settler.

References

Unincorporated communities in Stoddard County, Missouri
Unincorporated communities in Missouri
1880 establishments in Missouri
Populated places established in 1880